Charles Harold "Slim" Harding (January 3, 1891 – October 30, 1971) was a Major League Baseball pitcher who played in one game for the Detroit Tigers on September 18, . He pitched in two innings, and allowed three hits and one run.

External links

1891 births
1971 deaths
Detroit Tigers players
Major League Baseball pitchers
Baseball players from Nashville, Tennessee
Winston-Salem Twins players
Chattanooga Lookouts players
San Antonio Bronchos players
Milwaukee Brewers (minor league) players
Fort Worth Panthers players